Federico Zurlo (born 25 February 1994) is an Italian former professional racing cyclist, who rode professionally between 2015 and 2020 for the ,  and  teams. He was named in the startlist for the 2016 Vuelta a España, but he withdrew on stage 4.

Major results

2012
 4th Road race, UCI Junior Road World Championships
 5th Overall Giro della Lunigiana
 7th Paris–Roubaix Juniors
2013
 Coupe des nations Ville Saguenay
1st  Young rider classification
1st Stage 3
2014
 7th Memorial Marco Pantani
2016
 10th Overall Tour of Qinghai Lake
1st Stage 7
2019
 Tour of Japan
1st  Points classification
1st Stage 5
 1st Stage 3 Tour de Kumano
 4th Overall Tour of Szeklerland
 5th Giro dell'Appennino
2020
 7th Overall Tour of Antalya

Grand Tour general classification results timeline

References

External links
 

1994 births
Living people
Italian male cyclists
People from Cittadella
Cyclists from the Province of Padua